John Long of Draycot Cerne (c. 1419 – 20 September 1478)  was an English landowner and member of parliament.

Born in Wiltshire, the son of Robert Long and Margaret Godfrey, he was elected Member of Parliament for Cricklade in 1442 and in 1449 was an Elector for Wiltshire. He died on 20 September 1478 and is buried at Draycot Cerne, Wiltshire.

He married  Margaret Wayte who, according to the printed Long family pedigree, was his half-sister. There were three sons from this marriage including Sir Thomas Long of Draycot.

Further reading 
Inheriting the Earth: The Long Family's 500 Year Reign in Wiltshire; Cheryl Nicol

References 

1419 births
1478 deaths
John Long
English MPs 1442
Members of the Parliament of England (pre-1707) for Cricklade